Frantz Bergs (c. 1697–1787) was a Swedish goldsmith. His gold boxes are in the permanent collections of the Nationalmuseum and the Victoria and Albert Museum. He was the father of Swedish silversmith Julius Marianus Bergs (1741–1804).

References

1690s births
1787 deaths
Goldsmiths
18th-century Swedish artists
18th-century Swedish male artists